The UEFA Women's Champions League, previously called the UEFA Women's Cup (2001–2009), is a European women's association football competition. It involves the top club teams from countries affiliated with the European governing body UEFA.

The competition was first played in 2001–02 under the name UEFA Women's Cup, and renamed the Champions League for the 2009–10 edition. The most significant changes in 2009 were the inclusion of runners-up from the top eight ranked nations, a one-off final as opposed to the two-legged finals in previous years, and – until 2018 – playing the final in the same city as the men's UEFA Champions League final. From the 2021–22 season, the competition proper will include a group stage for the first time in the Women's Champions League era.

Lyon is the most successful club in the competition's history, winning the title eight times, including five consecutive titles from 2016 to 2020. They are currently the European champions, having beaten holders Barcelona in the 2022 final.

The idea of creating two new women's European Cups is regularly raised, to offer more matches.

Format

UEFA Women's Cup (2001–2009)

A preliminary round was played to reduce teams to 32, in the first season only two teams played a two-legged match, the following seasons were played as four team mini-tournaments which had the winner advance to the group stage. Teams were then divided into eight groups of four. The groups were played again as mini-tournaments at a single location over the course of five days. The group winners then advanced to the quarter-finals. The knock-out rounds were played as two-legged. That included the final which was only played as a single leg in 2002.

For the 2004–05 season the group stage was played in four groups with the top two teams advancing to the quarter-finals. That resulted in more qualifying groups.

Champions League (2009–2021)
On 11 December 2008, UEFA announced that the competition would be reformatted and renamed to the UEFA Women's Champions League. As in the men's game, the new tournament aims to include runners-up of the top women's football leagues in Europe, and the title holder has the right to enter if they do not qualify through their domestic competition. Also similar to the men, the final is to be played in a single match.

The competition is open to the champions of all 55 UEFA associations. However, not all associations have or had a qualifying women's league, and not all nations opt to participate each year. Due to the varying participation, the number of teams playing the qualifying round and teams entering in the round of 32 change from year to year. The principles are inferred from the access list: Numbers are based on three principles:
 Groups of 4 teams shall contest the qualifying rounds.
 The group winners shall qualify for the main round.
 The smallest possible number of qualifying group runners-up shall qualify for the main round.
For example, in a 53-team tournament, 25 teams directly enter the R32, with seven qualifying groups providing seven group winners and no runners-up; if the tournament were 60 teams instead, 20 teams would directly enter the R32, with ten qualifying groups providing ten group winners and two runners-up.

Minor adjustments
When the new format was initially announced, the eight top countries according to the UEFA league coefficient between 2003 and 2004 and 2007–08 would be awarded two places in the new Women's Champions League. The runners-up from each country participated in the qualifying rounds for the first two years under the Champions League format.

For the 2011–12 tournament, the runners-up from the top eight nations instead qualified directly to the R32. For the five years under this format, seven nations remained in the top eight: Germany, Sweden, England (both iterations), France, Denmark, Russia, and Italy. A different nation provided the eighth runner-up in each of the five years: Iceland, Norway, Austria, Czech Republic, and Spain in that order.

The tournament was expanded again for the 2016–17 season, with the runners-up from nations 9–12 in the UEFA league coefficient also qualifying. Whether they begin participation in the qualifying round or the R32 depends on how many total teams participate in the tournament. For the first three years under this format, the four nations in these slots were Czech Republic, Austria, Scotland, and Norway, though Czech Republic rose into the top 8 at the expense of Russia; for the 2019–20 season, Switzerland replaced Norway, and for the final season under this format, Norway, Kazakhstan, and The Netherlands replaced Russia, Scotland, and Austria in the top 12.

Champions League (2021–)
On 4 December 2019, the UEFA Executive Committee approved a new format for the 2021–22 season. The top six associations will enter three teams, the associations ranked 7–16 will enter two, and the remaining associations will enter one. The competition is restructured to appear much more similar to the men's CL format than before, with a double-round-robin group stage in the competition proper, the first time in the Women's Champions League era, and two paths (a champions path and a non-champions path) for all teams that do not automatically qualify for the group stage. UEFA will also centralize the media rights from the group stage onward, having previously only done so for the final.

Under this new format, the group stage – four groups of four – qualifies eight teams to the home-and-away quarterfinals, at which point the competition remains the same as before. Four teams qualify directly to the group stage: the defending UWCL champions and the league champions from the nations ranked 1–3 by UEFA coefficient. Seven teams qualify from the champions path – guaranteeing that at least ten nations will be represented in the group stage – and five from the league path. Qualification along both paths takes place in two rounds: a first round consisting of four-team, predetermined-venue miniature tournaments (one-off semifinals, third place, and final matches) and a second round of paired home-and-away ties. In this format, the first round is similar to the previous qualifying round except that teams play a two-game knockout tournament instead of a three-game round-robin, and the second round is similar to the previous round of 32 except that the range of possible opponents is more stratified.

Prize money
Prize-money was awarded for a first time in 2010 when both finalists received money. In 2011 the payments were extended to losing semi- and quarter-finalists. The current prize-money structure is
€250,000 winning team
€200,000 losing finalist
€50,000 losing semi-finalists
€25,000 losing quarter-finalists

In the Champions League teams also receive 20,000 Euro for playing each round or the qualifying. There have been several complaints about the sum, which doesn't cover costs for some longer trips which include flights.

The 2021–22 Women's Champions League introduced a 16-team group stage to the competition, for which each participant will receive €400,000 (about five times as much as Round of 16 participants received in previous editions). The winner of the 2021–22 tournament could earn up to €1.4 million depending on its results in the group stage (wins in the group stage are worth more than draws).

Sponsorship
Until the 2015–18 cycle, UEFA Women's Champions League used to have the same sponsors as the UEFA Champions League. However, starting from the 2018–21 cycle, women's football competitions – including the Champions League – have their separate sponsors. From the start of group stage in 2021/22, the tournament will have a rights' centralisation in stages before the final: in group stage, only some assets and the official ball are centralised, while in knock-out rounds – at least until 2022–23 – UEFA will allow only few club sponsors, alongside the ones who are official.

Records and statistics

Winners

By nation

Since the format change in 2009, no team from a nation outside the top two has won the title, except for Barcelona in 2021. The only teams from nations outside the top two to have finished runner-up in that time were Tyresö in 2014, Barcelona in 2019 and Chelsea in 2021.
 
Also, no team from a nation outside the top four made the semi-finals until Brøndby in 2015. Barcelona has since made the semi-finals in 2017, 2019, 2020 and 2021 (and they went on to win the title in 2021).

Top scorers by tournament
The top-scorer award is given to the player who scores the most goals in the entire competition, thus it includes the qualifying rounds. Iceland's Margrét Lára Vidarsdóttir has won the award three times. Ada Hegerberg holds the record for most goals in a season.

All-time top scorers
 Bold players still active.

International broadcasters
This article should not be confused with List of UEFA Champions League broadcasters

Global 
DAZN have the global rights of the competition from 2021–22 until 2024–25, 61 matches in both 2021–22 and 2022–23 seasons will be live streamed for free on the DAZN UEFA Women's Champions League YouTube channel.

MENA 
All matches from group stage until final will be aired live on beIN Sports until 2023–24 season.

United States 
ATA Football has agreeing a new partnership with DAZN which see the subscribers get access of 31 live matches from the tournament throughout the 2021/22 season. Those games will also be available to rewatch on the platform, as well as live on DAZN and its YouTube channel.

Gallery

See also

AFC Women's Club Championship
CAF Women's Champions League
Copa Libertadores Femenina

References

External links

Official website

 
Women
Women's association football competitions in Europe
Recurring sporting events established in 2001
Multi-national association football leagues in Europe
2001 establishments in Europe
Multi-national professional sports leagues
Association football events